Miss Helyett may refer to:

Miss Helyett (opera), an 1890 opérette by Edmond Audran
Miss Helyett (film), a 1933 French film based on the above